Dalkena is an unincorporated community in Pend Oreille County, in the U.S. state of Washington.

History
Dalkena had its start in the late 1800s when a sawmill opened at the site. The community's name is an amalgamation of Dalton and Kennedy, the proprietors of the mill. A post office called Dalkena was established in 1903, and remained in operation until 1942.

References

Unincorporated communities in Pend Oreille County, Washington
Unincorporated communities in Washington (state)